Kumar Aditya (born 6 March 1992) is an Indian cricketer. He made his first-class debut for Bihar in the 2018–19 Ranji Trophy on 7 January 2019. He made his List A debut on 28 September 2019, for Bihar in the 2019–20 Vijay Hazare Trophy.

References

External links
 

1992 births
Living people
Indian cricketers
Bihar cricketers
Place of birth missing (living people)